Barroso may refer to:

Places
Barroso (region), Portugal
Barroso, Minas Gerais, Brazil

Other use
Barroso (surname)
Barroso Commission, the European Commission led by José Manuel Barroso from 2004 to 2014
Brazilian ironclad Barroso, a gunboat in service from 1866 to 1882